This is a list of films produced in Kyrgyzstan.

A
Altyn Kyrghol (2001)

B
Beket (1995)
Beshkempir (1998)
Boz Salkyn (2007)  (English: Pure Coolness)

C
The Chimp (2001) (Kyrgyz: Maimil)

D
Down from the Seventh Floor (2005)

E
Ergii (2001)
The Empty Home (2012)

F
A Father's Will (2016)

G
Gde tvoy dom, ulitka? (1992)

H
Hassan Hussen (1997)
Heavenly Nomadic (2015)
Hot Summer (2004) (Kyrgyz: Saratan)

J
Jamila (1994)

K
Kurmanjan Datka: Queen of the Mountains (2014)

L
The Light Thief (2010)
Lullaby (2006)

M
Maimil (2001) (English: The Chimp)

P
Pure Coolness (2007)  (Kyrgyz: Boz Salkyn)

R
Running to the Sky (2019)

S
Sanzhyra (2001)
Saratan (2005) (English: Hot Summer)
Sel'kincek (1993)
Soolugan Güldör (2015)
Sunduk predkov (2006)

T
Taranci (1995)
The White Pony (1999)
Thief in Love (2009) (Russian: Vliublennyi Vor)

V
Vliublennyi Vor (2009) (English: Thief in Love)

W
The Wedding Chest (2006)

See also
List of Kyrgyz submissions for the Academy Award for Best Foreign Language Film

References

External links
 Kyrgyz film at the Internet Movie Database

Kyrgyzstan

Films